Forbesganj is a (proposed district)city with municipality in the Araria District (formerly Purnia District before 1992) in the state of Bihar, India, situated at the border of Nepal.

Etymology
During the British Raj the area was under the administration of a British district collector and municipal commissioner, Alexander John Forbes (1807-1890) of East India Company. Forbes had a bungalow at the same location. Consequently the area was known as 'residential area' also abbreviated as 'R-area'. Overtime the name transformed to 'Araria' and the neighbouring subdivision came to be known as 'Forbesganj'.

History 

The city was given its present name from its British district collector and municipal commissioner, Alexander John Forbes (1807-1869). A.J. Forbes was a military adventurer and had taken part in the adventures of Northwest India. He was also in the team of Commissioner George Yule of Bhagalpur while fighting the rebels of 73rd native infantry. A.J. Forbes founded the Sultanpur estate and a number of indigo factories situated at different places in this district.

After the Independence the name was changed to Forbesganj. It is said that the British used this place for Indigo farming. Still the remains of the British premises can be seen at the banks of the famous landlocked water body Sultan Pokhar. This city is famous for its culture.

Geography 

It has an average elevation of 46 meters (150 feet). The Nepalese border is only 12 km away.

Climate 
This small city has hot and wet summers and cold and dry winters. This place also got the record of having experienced the coldest ever recorded temperature in Bihar at -2.1 °C.

Demographics 

Forbesganj is a Nagar Parishad city in district of Araria, Bihar. The Forbesganj city is divided into 25 wards for which elections are held every 5 years. The Forbesganj Nagar Parishad has population of 50,475 of which 26,524 are males while 23,951 are females as per report released by Census India 2011.

Population of Children with age of 0-6 is 7512 which is 14.88% of total population of Forbesganj (Nagar Parishad). In Forbesganj Nagar Parishad, Female Sex Ratio is of 903 against state average of 918. Moreover Child Sex Ratio in Forbesganj is around 963 compared to Bihar state average of 935. Literacy rate of Forbesganj city is 78.64% higher than state average of 61.80%. In Forbesganj, Male literacy is around 82.94% while female literacy rate is 73.83%.

Languages 

The main language spoken over here is Hindi. But, there are people who speak Maithili, Bhojpuri, Urdu, Bengali, Marwari as well, etc.

Administration and politics 

Forbesganj Municipal Corporation is responsible for maintaining the city's civic infrastructure and carrying out associated administrative duties.

Forbesganj (Vidhan Sabha constituency) is a assembly constituency in Araria district in the Indian state of Bihar. 

Vidyasagar Kesari is the MLA of Forbesganj assembly constituency. He was first elected in 2015 Bihar Legislative Assembly election, and re-elected in 2020 Bihar Legislative Assembly election.

Amenities
Sub divisional Hospital Forbesganj is located near the Subdivision Office, Forbesganj

Economy 

In addition to its role as an educational and administrative place, the economy of this small city is fueled by fertilizer production, rice production, building and construction material supply, and other industry.

Makhana is produced in Forbesganj, Makhana packets are prepared  and sent by train to other cities.

Culture/Cityscape 
The city is well planned with a central road, Sadar Road, which runs through the heart of Forbesganj. Most of the major shops are located on both the sides of this road. Another major road, Hospital Road, connects to the main bus stand; it passes through the other part of the city and joins to the highways.

Transport

Road 

( Formerly NH-57) and  connects Forbesganj. Daily bus service is available from the Purnia, Patna, Siliguri, Kolkata, Bhagalpur, Katihar, Birpur, Jogbani, Saharsa, Darbhanga & Muzaffarpur.

Rail 

Forbesganj Junction Railway Station lies on Barauni-Katihar, Saharsa and Purnia sections. The Saharsa-Forbesganj section is under construction into Broad Gauge.

Air 
Forbesganj Airport was a functional military airport between 1934 to 1942 (active during World War II) and again during the 1962 war with China. On 10 June 1973 a Royal Nepal Airlines DHC-6 Twin Otter Plane was hijacked en route to Kathmandu from Biratnagar. This airport has now fallen into disrepair and is not operational.

The nearest active airport to this place is Biratnagar (Nepal). Closest domestic airports are Darbhanga Airport in Darbhanga, Bihar and Bagdogra Airport in Siliguri, West Bengal, both about 160 km away.  Jay Prakash Narayan International Airport in the Bihar state's capital city Patna is approximately 300 km. away. From Bagdogra Airport it takes 3–4 hours to reach the city by road.

Education 
There are several CBSE and State Board schools in this city.
Some Senior Secondary schools are Mithila Public School (established in 1989), S.R.S Vidya Mandir, Modern/Premier Academy, Pi World school, Shishu Bharti, Delhi Public School Forbesganj, DAV Public School, Central Public School, Dev Gurukul Primary School and Sisu Mandir, Genius Academy etc.

All Colleges of this city are under Purnia University.
There is also an Engineering college present in the city named Moti Babu Institute of Technology

Media
Major daily Hindi news circulated in Forbesganj include Dainik Jagaran, Hindustan, Dainik Bhaskar and Prabhat Khabar.

Notable people 
 
 Phanishwar Nath Renu from Simraha (Forbesgsanj)

References 

 
Cities and towns in Araria district